Dagur Arngrímsson (born ) is an Icelandic chess International Master. He played for Iceland in the European Team Chess Championship of 2009.

On the November 2009 FIDE rating list he has an Elo rating of 2375.

References

External links

1987 births
Living people
Dagur Arngrimsson
Chess International Masters